The president of the Democratic Republic of Timor Leste is the head of state of the Democratic Republic of Timor Leste. The executive powers of the president are limited however, the president is also the ex officio head of the Council of State, able to veto legislation and is the supreme commander of the Timor Leste Defence Force.

Key
Political parties
 
 
 

Other factions
 

Symbols
 † Assassinated

Presidents of East Timor during War for Independence

Presidents of the Democratic Republic of Timor-Leste

Latest election

See also
 East Timor
 Politics of East Timor
 List of colonial governors of Portuguese Timor
 Prime Minister of East Timor
 First Lady of East Timor
 Lists of office-holders

Notes

References

 
1975 establishments in East Timor
2002 establishments in East Timor
Presidents